The First Thurston County Courthouse, in Pender, Nebraska, was listed on the National Register of Historic Places in 1990.  It consists of two contributing buildings.

The older building, at 222 Main Street, was built by 1889 and after purchase by the county for $1500 served as courthouse for Thurston County.

The second building, adjacent, was built in 1892 as a U-shaped hotel building known as Peebles House.

References

Courthouses on the National Register of Historic Places in Nebraska
Renaissance Revival architecture in Nebraska
National Register of Historic Places in Thurston County, Nebraska
Hotels in Nebraska
Courthouses in Nebraska